Tetrazygia is a genus of flowering plants in the family Melastomataceae. They are native to the Antilles, and one species also occurs in Florida in the United States. The circumscription of the genus has been debated, but in general, about 25 species are accepted. Clover ash is a common name for plants in this genus.

Species include:
 Tetrazygia albicans (D. Don ex Naud.) Triana
 Tetrazygia bicolor
Tetrazygia decorticans
 Tetrazygia elegans Urban

References

 
Melastomataceae genera
Taxonomy articles created by Polbot